Tchaoudjo is a prefecture located in the Centrale Region of Togo. The capital city is Sokodé.

Canton (administrative divisions) of Tchaoudjo include Komah, Kéméni, Agoulou, Wassarabo, Kparatao, Aléhéridè, Kadambara, Lama-Tessi, Kolina, Kpangalam, Tchalo, Kpassouadè, and Amaïdè.

See also
Alédjo Wildlife Reserve

References 

Prefectures of Togo
Centrale Region, Togo